Anže Kuralt (born October 31, 1991) is a Slovenian professional ice hockey player who is currently under contract to Fehérvár AV19 of the ICE Hockey League (ICEHL).

On January 6, 2014, Kuralt was named to Team Slovenia's official 2014 Winter Olympics roster.

Career statistics

Regular season and playoffs

International

References

External links

1991 births
Living people
Fehérvár AV19 players
Brûleurs de Loups players
Dauphins d'Épinal players
Gothiques d'Amiens players
Graz 99ers players
Herning Blue Fox players
HK Acroni Jesenice players
Ice hockey players at the 2014 Winter Olympics
Olympic ice hockey players of Slovenia
Sportspeople from Kranj
Slovenian ice hockey left wingers
Ice hockey players at the 2018 Winter Olympics
Slovenian expatriate ice hockey people
Slovenian expatriate sportspeople in Austria
Slovenian expatriate sportspeople in France
Slovenian expatriate sportspeople in Denmark
Slovenian expatriate sportspeople in Hungary
Expatriate ice hockey players in Austria
Expatriate ice hockey players in France
Expatriate ice hockey players in Denmark
Expatriate ice hockey players in Hungary